Marte Vallis is a valley in the Amazonis quadrangle of Mars, located at 15 North and 176.5 West.  It is 185 km long and was named for the Spanish word for "Mars". It has been identified as an outflow channel, carved in the geological past by catastrophic release of water from aquifers beneath the Martian surface.  The surface material is thought to have been created out of 'a'ā and pāhoehoe lava flows from the Elysium volcanic province in the west.

Marte Vallis is the site of the first discovery of columnar jointing on Mars.  Columnar jointing often forms when basalt lava cools.

References

See also

 Columnar jointing
 Geology of Mars
 HiWish program
 HiRISE
 Amazonis quadrangle
 Vallis

Amazonis quadrangle
Valleys and canyons on Mars